The Miss Georgia competition is the pageant that selects the representative for the state of Georgia in the Miss America pageant.

Georgia has won the Miss America crown twice - Neva Jane Langley of Lakeland, Florida who won the 1953 Miss America title, and in 2015, when Betty Cantrell of Warner Robins was named Miss America 2016, making her the first native-born Miss Georgia to hold the Miss America title.

In the fall of 2018, the Miss America Organization (MAO) terminated Miss Georgia organization's license as well as licenses from Florida, New Jersey, New York, Pennsylvania, Tennessee, and West Virginia. On December 22, 2018; the MAO reinstated the license for the Miss Georgia organization to Trina Pruitt.

Kelsey Hollis of Warner Robins was crowned Miss Georgia 2022 on June 18, 2022 at River Center for the Performing Arts in Columbus. She represented Georgia and competed for the title of Miss America 2023 at the Mohegan Sun in Uncasville, Connecticut in December 2022 where she was named 4th runner-up along with winning a Preliminary Social Impact Pitch award.

Gallery of past titleholders

Results summary
The following is a visual summary of the past results of Miss Georgia titleholders at the national Miss America pageants/competitions. The year in parentheses indicates the year of the national competition during which a placement and/or award was garnered, not the year attached to the contestant's state title.

Placements
 Miss Americas: Neva Jane Langley (1953), Betty Cantrell (2016)
 1st runners-up: Jody Shattuck (1958), Kara Martin (1994), Monica Pang (2006), Chasity Hardman (2009), Victoria Hill (2020)
 2nd runners-up: Janey Miller (1946), Kristl Evans (1982), Amanda Kozak (2007)
 3rd runners-up: Andrea Krahn (1995)
 4th runners-up: Kelsey Hollis (2023)
 Top 10: Estelle Bradley (1924), Jeannie Cross (1963), Cynthia Cook (1972), Bobbie Eakes (1983), Marlesa Ball (1987), Danica Tisdale (2005), Leah Massee (2008), Carly Mathis (2014)
 Top 12: Alyssa Beasley (2018)
 Top 15: Alice Talton (1938), Esther Shepard (1941), Jerry Long (1948), Andrea Bailey (2004)

Awards

Preliminary awards
 Preliminary Lifestyle and Fitness: Janey Miller (1946), Neva Jane Langley (1953), Jody Shattuck (1958), Kelly Jerles (1988), Kara Martin (1994), Emily Foster (2002), Carly Mathis (2014)
 Preliminary On Stage Interview: Victoria Hill (2020)
 Preliminary Talent: Janey Miller (1946), Neva Jane Langley (1953), Cynthia Cook (1972), Danica Tisdale (2005), Chasity Hardman (2009), Betty Cantrell (2016), Victoria Hill (2020)
 Preliminary On-Stage Question: Amy Mulkey (2003)
 Preliminary Social Impact Pitch: Kelsey Hollis (2023)

Non-finalist awards
 Non-finalist Talent: Seva Day (1976), Sandra Eakes (1980), Camille Bentley (1985), Kelly Jerles (1988), Jamie Price (1990), April Brinson (1999), Osjha Anderson (2000)
 Non-finalist Interview: Darla Pruett (tie) (1991)

Other awards
 Dr. David B. Allman Medical Scholarship: Sandy Adamson (1977), Shea Olliff (1997)
 Children's Miracle Network (CMN) Miracle Maker 1st runners-up: Maggie Bridges (2015)
Equity and Justice 1st runner-up: Karson Pennington (2022)
 Quality of Life Award Finalists: Christina McCauley (2011), Annie Jorgensen (2019)
 STEM Scholarship Award Winners: Maggie Bridges (2015)
 Women in Business Scholarship Award Winners: Patricia Ford (2017)

Winners

Notes

References

External links
 Miss Georgia official website

Georgia (U.S. state) culture
Georgia
Women in Georgia (U.S. state)
Annual events in Georgia (U.S. state)